The Men's marathon at the 2004 Summer Olympics took place on August 29 in the streets of Athens, Greece. One hundred and one athletes from 59 nations competed. The event was won by Stefano Baldini of Italy, the nation's first victory in the event since 1988 and second overall. The United States reached the podium in the event for the first time since 1976 with Meb Keflezighi's silver. Vanderlei de Lima took bronze, Brazil's first-ever medal in the men's marathon.

As with the previous Games, the marathon also marked the end of the 2004 Summer Olympics and the medal ceremony took place during the closing ceremony at the Olympic Stadium.

Summary

The 42-km (26-mile) journey began in Marathon. The top contenders all found themselves in a large leading group that held a modest pace through the half marathon. A few tried to surge ahead but the most successful was Vanderlei De Lima's attack at 20k. Past 25k, Stefano Baldini raised the tempo taking seven others with him. Finally, the chase group had been whittled down to three: Stefano Baldini, Paul Tergat, and Mebrahtom Keflezighi. After 35k was passed, Tergat (the world record holder) cracked, leaving two runners to chase behind. Baldini then closed the gap to De Lima after the latter was attacked by a spectator while dropping Keflezighi. Baldini moved into the lead and took it home for the gold medal in 2:10:55. Keflezighi caught the fading De Lima as well to take the silver in 2:11:29. Finishing at 2:12:11, De Lima was able to hold off Jon Brown, beating him by 15 seconds for the bronze.

Incident

The event was marked by an incident in which Neil Horan, an Irish priest, grappled Vanderlei de Lima of Brazil while de Lima was leading the event with around 7 kilometers remaining. Greek spectator Polyvios Kossivas helped de Lima free from Horan's grasp and back into his running. De Lima lost about 15 to 20 seconds of time because of the interruption, and finished third in the event with a time of 2:12:11, winning the bronze medal. De Lima received the rarely awarded Pierre de Coubertin medal for sportsmanship in addition to his bronze. Despite the fact that the incident had seriously hindered his chances of winning the gold or silver medal, he did not complain and graciously acknowledged the crowd's cheers in the home straight. The protester had a sign on his back that read "The Grand Prix Priest. Israel Fulfilment of Prophecy Says The Bible. The Second Coming is Near."

The phrase "Grand Prix Priest" refers to Horan's previous protest, in which he ran onto the track at the Silverstone Circuit during the 2003 British Grand Prix, intentionally running directly into the path of oncoming cars.

Background

This was the 25th appearance of the event, which is one of 12 athletics events to have been held at every Summer Olympics. Returning runners from the 2000 marathon included silver medalist Erick Wainaina of Kenya and fourth-place finisher Jon Brown of Great Britain. The reigning world champion was Jaouad Gharib of Morocco. There was "no definite favorite" in the field. 

Belarus, the Czech Republic, and Saint Lucia each made their first appearance in Olympic men's marathons; East Timor made its first formal appearance, though it had had one Independent Olympic Athlete from East Timor in 2000. The United States made its 24th appearance, most of any nation, having missed only the boycotted 1980 Games.

Qualification

The qualification period for athletics was 1 January 2003 to 9 August 2004. For the men's marathon, each National Olympic Committee was permitted to enter up to three athletes that had run the race in 2:15:00 or faster during the qualification period. The maximum number of athletes per nation had been set at 3 since the 1930 Olympic Congress. If an NOC had no athletes that qualified under that standard, one athlete that had run the race in 2:18:00 or faster could be entered.

Competition format and course

As all Olympic marathons, the competition was a single race. The marathon distance of 26 miles, 385 yards was run over a point-to-point route through the streets of Athens. These streets were recently painted for the event, which provided an excellent road surface for the athletes. Drawing upon the ancient origins of the race, the marathon began in Marathon, Greece, and eventually ended at Panathinaiko Stadium, the venue previously used for the 1896 Athens Olympics.

Records

, the existing world and Olympic records were as follows.

No new records were set during the competition.

Schedule

The day was "the hottest day ever for an Olympic marathon, with the temperature just above 30° C. (86° F.)."

All times are Greece Standard Time (UTC+2)

Results

Eighty-one runners finished; 20 did not.

References

External links
 IAAF Athens 2004 Olympic Coverage

M
Marathons at the Olympics
2004 marathons
Men's marathons
2004
Men's events at the 2004 Summer Olympics